"A Small Victory" is the 10th track and the second single from American rock band Faith No More's fourth studio album Angel Dust, released as a single on August 3, 1992. The song was later remixed by Youth of Killing Joke and released later the same month. It was their last single to chart on the US Billboard Modern Rock Tracks charts, peaking at number 11, and reached the top 30 in Finland and the United Kingdom. When asked about the song's meaning, Mike Patton said:

Artwork
The cover features a vintage World War 2 photograph of a soldier loading shells which originally featured on the cover of Life Magazine in September 1939.

Music video
At the time it was described as their "most radio-friendly song" and stylistically more of a "dance song" than their other works. For this reason the band wanted a music video "visual to complement it."

The video was directed by Marcus Nispel, known for his work with C+C Music Factory. On September 2, 1993, the music video was nominated for the MTV Video Music Awards for Best Art Direction, but lost to Madonna's song "Rain" off her album Erotica.

Track lists

Personnel

 Mike Patton – vocals
 Jim Martin – guitars
 Billy Gould – bass
 Roddy Bottum – keyboards
 Mike Bordin – drums
 Martin Glover – remixes
 John Brough – engineer on remixed tracks
 Green Ink – sleeve artwork
 Ross Halfin – band photo

Charts

Release history

References

1992 songs
American alternative rock songs
Faith No More songs
London Records singles
Music videos directed by Marcus Nispel
Reprise Records singles
Slash Records singles
Songs written by Billy Gould
Songs written by Jim Martin (musician)
Songs written by Mike Bordin
Songs written by Mike Patton
Songs written by Roddy Bottum